Kilinochchi District ( Kiḷinocci Māvaṭṭam) is one of the 25 districts of Sri Lanka, the second level administrative division of the country. The district is administered by a District Secretariat headed by a District Secretary (previously known as a Government Agent) appointed by the central government of Sri Lanka. The capital of the district is the town of Kilinochchi.

History

Between 5th century BC and 13th century AD present day Kilinochchi District was part of Rajarata. Much of Kilinochchi District was thereafter part of the pre-colonial Jaffna kingdom. The district then came under Portuguese, Dutch and British control. In 1815 the British gained control of the entire island of Ceylon. They divided the island into three ethnic based administrative structures: Low Country Sinhalese, Kandyan Sinhalese and Tamil. The district, which was then part of Jaffna District, was part of the Tamil administration. In 1833, in accordance with the recommendations of the Colebrooke-Cameron Commission, the ethnic based administrative structures were unified into a single administration divided into five geographic provinces. Jaffna District, together with Mannar District and Vanni District, formed the new Northern Province.

The district was colonised in 1936 by residents from Jaffna Peninsula as part of a scheme that sought to ease overpopulation and unemployment. At the time that Ceylon gained independence, Jaffna was one of the three districts located in the Northern Province. Parts of Jaffna District were transferred to newly created Mullaitivu District in September 1978. Kilinochchi District was carved out of the southern part of Jaffna District in February 1984.

Kilinochchi District was under the control of rebel Liberation Tigers of Tamil Eelam for many years during the civil war. The district was recaptured by the Sri Lankan military in late 2008/early 2009.

Geography
Kilinochchi District is located in the north of Sri Lanka in the Northern Province.

Administrative units
Kilinochchi District is divided into 4 Divisional Secretary's Division (DS Divisions), each headed by a Divisional Secretary (previously known as an Assistant Government Agent). The DS Divisions are further sub-divided into 95 Grama Niladhari Divisions (GN Divisions).

Demographics

Population
Kilinochchi District's population was 112,875 in 2011. The population of the district is almost exclusively Sri Lankan Tamil.

The population of the district, like the rest of the north and east of Sri Lanka, has been heavily affected by the civil war. The war killed an estimated 100,000 people. Several hundred thousand Sri Lankan Tamils, possibly as much as one million, emigrated to the West during the war. Many Sri Lankan Tamils also moved to the relative safety of the capital Colombo. Most of the Sri Lankan Moors and Sinhalese who lived in the district fled to other parts of Sri Lanka or were forcibly expelled by the rebel Liberation Tigers of Tamil Eelam.

Ethnicity

Religion
There are 92,986 Hindus in Kilinochchi District.Also ''18,499 Christians, 1275 Buddhists, 700 Muslims and 50'' Other Religious people in Kilinochchi District

Politics and government

Local government
Kilinochchi District has three local authorities all of which are Divisional Councils (Pradesha Sabhai or Pradeshiya Sabha).

Notes

References

External links

 Kilinochchi District Secretariat

 
1984 establishments in Sri Lanka
Districts of Sri Lanka